This is a list of films produced by the Tollywood film industry based in Madras & Hyderabad in 1952. Movies Released 25. Data collected from Song books, from news papers

References

External links
 Earliest Telugu language films at IMDb.com (149 to 167)

1952
Telugu
Telugu films